22nd Street station is an underground trolley station in Center City Philadelphia that serves the SEPTA Subway–Surface Trolley Lines. Similar to 19th Street station, three blocks east of it, the station has two side platforms and a total of four tracks. The station serves only subway–surface trolleys on the two outer tracks; the Market-Frankford Line subway uses the two inner tracks and bypasses the station as it travels between 15th Street and 30th Street station.

The station was constructed by the Philadelphia Transportation Company in 1955, a replacement for the nearby 24th Street station just north of Market Street at the east end of the now-removed shared train and trolley bridge over the Schuylkill River. The former station site is now the Crown Lights Building (a tall rectangular black skyscraper topped with 4 large LED message boards atop its upper sides), the headquarters of PECO Energy.

History 

It featured a bridge – located north of Market Street and south of Filbert Street – that carried both the subway and subway–surface lines over the Schuylkill River. The PRT bridge connected surface trolley lines in West Philadelphia to the underground subway–surface loop in Center City. The station at 24th Street was constructed of wood and built atop an embankment. It was the only subway–surface station not physically underground and was located one block from the Philadelphia station of the Baltimore & Ohio Railroad, which served B&O tracks running north-south along the east bank of the Schuylkill.

The PRT announced a project to bury the elevated tracks between 23rd to 46th streets in the 1920s. The tunnel from 23rd to 32nd streets was completed by 1933, but construction on the remaining segment was put on hiatus due to the Great Depression and World War II. The PRT went bankrupt in 1939, and was reorganized as the PTC, which began building the rest of the tunnel in 1947.

The tunnel opened for service on October 15 1955, marking the closure of the eastbound elevated station and the opening of the current underground station. The following month, on November 6, the westbound side elevated station closed. The PRT bridge that formerly had carried subway cars and subway–surface trolleys over the river was torn down by June 20, 1956. Nothing remains of the 24th Street station. Instead, the PECO Building, headquarters of PECO Energy division of Exelon, now occupies the site.

The station originally served Routes 10, 11, 31, 34, 37 and 38. Route 31 was rerouted out of the tunnel in 1949 and buses replaced trolleys on routes 37 and 38 in 1955. Routes 13 and 36 began serving the station (and the subway–surface tunnel) in 1956.

Modernization 
Turnstiles were constructed on the westbound platform for all-door boarding in the SEPTA Key fare collection system. As such, fares are paid prior to system entry and no fares are collected on trolleys outbound (westbound) from Center City, but still must be paid at the trolley fare box inbound (eastbound) to Center City.

Station layout 
The station has two low-level side platforms, each capable of platforming two trolleys.

References

External links 
 

SEPTA Subway–Surface Trolley Line stations
Railway stations in Philadelphia
Railway stations in the United States opened in 1955
Railway stations located underground in Pennsylvania
1955 establishments in Pennsylvania